High January is the ninth album by Canadian music artist Marker Starling (Chris A. Cummings), released on . It is composed entirely of original material, being produced for the first time by Sean O'Hagan, whose previous work with Stereolab, The High Llamas and Microdisney brought extensive experience to helping achieve a fully-realized Marker Starling sound. Laetitia Sadier, also of Stereolab, contributes vocals to two tracks, "Waiting for Grace" and "Starved for Glamour".

Tim Sendra of AllMusic wrote in his review, – ..."this is serious mood music and Cummings made a fine choice by picking a producer who knows how to sustain a consistent mood, and by bringing along his crack band to back him."

Track listing

Side 1
 High January
 Wait The Night
 Drop And Pierce
 Waiting For Grace

Side 2
 Move It On
 Starved For Glamour
 Coin of the Realm
 A Little Joy

Personnel
Vocals – Laetitia Sadier
Backing Vocals – Connor Blundell, Mason Le Long, Nicholas Krgovich
Drums – Euan Rodger
Guitar – Andy Whitehead
Bass – Joe Carvell
Artwork, Layout – Sharmila Banerjee
Engineer, Audio mixing, Programming (Synthesizer) – Andy Ramsay
Mastering – Noel Summerville
Producer, Mixing, Bass, Electric Organ [Hohner Symphonic 30N], Synthesizer [Roland System 100], Programming – Sean O'Hagan
Recording engineer [Additional] – Mason Le Long
Written-By, Electric piano [RMI], Electric organ [Lowrey MicroGenie], Synthesizer [Solina String Ensemble], Synthesizer [Roland System 100], Electric Piano [Rhodes], Electric Piano [Wurlitzer], Synthesizer [WASP], Vocals – Chris A. Cummings

Recorded At – Press Play Studios /
Mastered At – 3345 Mastering /
Phonographic Copyright (p) – Tin Angel Records /
Copyright (c) – Tin Angel Records

References

External links
Waiting For Grace (Official Video) 

2020 albums